Mardy Fish was the defending champion, and in a repeat of the previous year's final, he successfully defended his title by defeating his compatriot John Isner after dropping the opening set.  This time the score was 3–6, 7–6(8–6), 6–2.

Seeds
The top four seeds received a bye into the second round.

Qualifying

Draw

Finals

Top half

Bottom half

References
Main Draw

Atlanta Tennis Championships - Singles
2011 Singles